Siravand (also Romanized as Sīrāvand; also known as Sīrāvan and Sirwān) is a village in Darbandrud Rural District, in the Central District of Asadabad County, Hamadan Province, Iran. At the 2006 census, its population was 888, in 211 families.

References 

Populated places in Asadabad County